This is a list of all the shopping malls in Finland, according to the area they are located in.

Helsinki Area 
 Ainoa
 Arabia
 Citycenter
 Columbus
 Dixi
 Easton Helsinki
 Entresse
 Flamingo
 Forum
 Galleria
 Grani
 Heikintori
 Hertsi
 Iso Omena
 Itis
 Jumbo
 Kampin Keskus
 Kluuvi
 Lauttis
 Länsiviitta
 Myyrmanni
 Redi
 Ristikko
 Ruoholahti
 Sello
 Mall of Tripla

Kuopio Area 
 IsoCee
 Matkus
 Minna

Oulu Area 
 Valkea
 Zeppelin
Idea Park Oulu

Tampere Area 
 Duo
 Ideapark Lempäälä
 Koskikeskus
 Like (Lielahtikeskus)
 Ratina
 Tullintori
 Veska
 Westeri

Turku Area 
 Hansa
 Mylly
 Skanssi

Rest of Finland
 Chydenia, Kokkola
 Goodman, Hämeenlinna
 IsoKarhu, Pori
 Lähde, Rajamäki
 Torikeskus, Jyväskylä
 Torikeskus, Seinäjoki
 Viiri, Klaukkala

Finland
Shopping malls